André Luiz da Silva Pereira, well known as André Vazzios (Santo André, July 22, 1975) is a Brazilian colorist, comics artist and architect. Graduated in Architecture from Mackenzie Presbyterian University, he began his career as an illustrator in 1995 at the Abril Jovem publishing house.

Vazzios gained prominence in the Brazilian comics market for his work as colorist in the comic books Holy Avenger (script by Marcelo Cassaro and pencils by Erica Awano) and Lua dos Dragões (script by Cassaro and pencils by Vazzios), both part of the fictional universe of Tormenta RPG system. For these works, he won the Troféu HQ Mix in 2002 in the category "best colorist" and the Prêmio Angelo Agostini in 2003 and 2004 as "best art-technique" (award for colorists and letterers). He also won the Troféu HQ Mix in 1999 for "best national miniseries" by Lua dos Dragões.

Other works by Vazzios are the colors of the comic book Victory (script by Cassaro and pencils by Edu Francisco, published in the United States by Image Comics), covers of the Brazilian magazine Metal Pesado (unofficial version of the American magazine Heavy Metal, with comics of Brazilian artists), illustrations of the role-playing game magazine Dragão Brasil and participation in the graphic novel MSP +50 - Mauricio de Sousa por Mais 50 artists, which published versions of the classic characters of Mauricio de Sousa re-created by 50 different Brazilian independent artists.

In 2009, Vazzios published the independent graphic novel Uiara e os filhos do Eco. The book was produced with funding from the São Paulo State's Secretary of Culture and addresses ecological issues. The script was made by Vazzios and Jussara Nunes. He also shares the pencils with Monique Novaes and Everton Teles Valério.

Bibliography 

There are related only the works of André Vazzios as writer and/or penciller.
 Lua dos Dragões (6 issues mini-series, written by Marcelo Cassaro, Trama Editorial, 1998-1999)
 Uiara e os filhos do Eco (independent, 2009)
 MSP +50 – Mauricio de Sousa por Mais 50 Artistas (many artists, Panini Brasil, 2010)

References 

Living people
Brazilian comics artists
Fantasy artists
Role-playing game artists
Comics colorists
Brazilian speculative fiction artists
Year of birth missing (living people)
Prêmio Angelo Agostini winners